Reshad Strik (born 22 June 1981 in Canberra, Australia) is a Bosnian-Australian actor and filmmaker.

Biography and career  
Strik was born on 22 June 1981 in Canberra, Australia to a Bosnian Muslim father and an Australian mother, he was raised on Central Coast of New South Wales and attended the Australian Academy of Dramatic Art (now the Australian Institute of Music - Dramatic Arts) where he graduated from in 2004.

Casting directors from the hit series headLand spotted him and offered him an ensemble lead role in the popular series. After shooting 70 episodes the show came to an end and Reshad seized the opportunity to work in Los Angeles.

Reshad made his leading debut in acclaimed Hong Kong director Fruit Chan's psychological thriller Don't Look Up. He also played Mickey an American soldier in Wes Craven's The Hills Have Eyes 2 for 20th Century Fox. Strik appeared as a rebellious surfer in the Australian film Newcastle, which debuted at the 2008 Tribeca Film Festival. He featured in the Jonathan Schwartz-produced independent film Spooner opposite Nora Zehetner and Matthew Lillard and also the vimeo sensation SCI-FI "STASIS", directed by Christian Swegal. Co-starring with Reshad were Beau Bridges and Ernie Hudson.

He also appeared as the male love interest in "A Public Affair", a music video by pop singer Jessica Simpson that features various cameos of actors and singers.

In 2010 Reshad married in his father's native city Sarajevo, Bosnia and Herzegovina. There he spent time learning his father's native language and producing and directing music videos and commercials. Reshad also completed two feature films in Bosnia and Herzegovina, Crossroads with acclaimed Turkish indie director Faysal Soysal and the Bosnian film Ja sam iz Krajine, zemlje kestena, which was released in 2013.

In 2013, he met with Turkish producers. Not knowing a word of Turkish, Reshad was invited to Turkey's booming Cinema and TV industry. Seizing this opportunity, Reshad took intensive language classes. Strik has now acted in TV series Filinta, and played the role of Claudius in TRT1's Diriliş: Ertuğrul.

Reshad currently resides in Sarajevo, Bosnia and Herzegovina with his family.

Filmography

Filmmaking
Dragon Ball Futon Short Film (2003)
You Can Get it Anywhere Short Film (2006)
The Hills Have Eyes 2 (2007)
A man worth knowing Commercial (2011)
Dah Ljubavi Music video (2012)
The Prophet in my Life Documentary (2012)
Tom Waterhouse Sketch Comedy (2013)
Brad Pitt - Chanel no 5 Sketch Comedy (2013)
NorthPole Sketch Comedy (2013)

References

Other links

Visualhollywood.com The Hills Have Eyes 2 profile. Strik is covered in the cast bio.
 " Strik features in GQ july 2008"

1981 births
Living people
Australian Institute of Music alumni
Australian male film actors
Australian male television actors
Australian expatriate male actors in the United States
Australian people of Bosnia and Herzegovina descent
Australian people of Bosniak descent